Chondrina oligodonta is a species of land snail in the family Chondrinidae. It is endemic to Italy, where it is found in rocky habitat. It is threatened by habitat loss and fragmentation, especially due to marble quarrying in the area.

References

Chondrinidae
Endemic fauna of Italy
Gastropods described in 1879
Taxonomy articles created by Polbot